Photonics and Nanostructures: Fundamentals and Applications is a peer-reviewed scientific journal, published quarterly by Elsevier. The editors-in-chief are A. Di Falco University of St Andrews, M. Lapine University of Technology Sydney, P. Tassin Chalmers University of Technology, M. Vanwolleghem Centre National de la Recherche Scientifique (CNRS), Villeneuve-d'Ascq, L. O'Faolain (W. Whelan-Curtin) Cork Institute of Technology.

Scope 
This journal covers research in experiment, theory, and applications of photonic crystals and photonic band gaps. Additionally, the journal focuses on topics concerning the development of faster telecommunications and the transition from computer-electronics to computer-photonics. Coverage also includes the general topic of fabrication of photonic crystal structures and devices. Devices at the micro and nano levels are also included. At this size, these are optical waveguides, switches, lasers, components of photonic (optical) integrated circuits, photonic crystal integrated circuits, micro-optical-electro-mechanical-systems (MOEMS), photonic (optical) micro-cavities, and photonic "dots".

Abstracting and indexing
This journal is abstracted and indexed in:

According to the Journal Citation Reports, the journal has a 2020 impact factor of 3.008.

References

External links 
 

Materials science journals
Publications established in 2003
Elsevier academic journals
Quarterly journals
English-language journals
Nanotechnology journals